The  is the top tag team title defended in the Japanese professional wrestling promotion Big Japan Pro Wrestling. The championship has been the leading tag team championship in the promotion since 1997. There have been a total of 57 reigns shared between 43 different teams consisting of 52 distinctive champions. The current champions are Okami (Daichi Hashimoto and Hideyoshi Kamitani) who are in their third reign as a team.

Title history
The title was created on June 3, 1997, when Takashi Ishikawa and Kengo Kimura defeated Shoji Nakamaki and Takashi Okano in the finals of a five-team scramble tournament to become the first champions. The championship has been the leading tag team championship in the promotion since 1997. The title matches are done with normal rules, but they also can be done by deathmatches. Like most professional wrestling championships, the title is won via the result of a scripted match. Title changes usually happen at BJW-promoted events; although the title has only changed hands twice at a non-BJW event, it has been defended in several other promotions like Combat Zone Wrestling and Fuyuki Army.

Combined reigns 

By team 

{| class="wikitable sortable" style="text-align: center"
!Rank
!Team
!No. ofreigns
!Combineddefenses
!Combineddays
|-
!1
|Yankee Nichōkenjū || 3 || 24 || 992
|-
!2
| Twin Towers || 2 || 10 || 733
|-
!3
|style="background:#FFE6BD"| Astronauts † || 3 || 10 || +
|-
!4
| Men's Club || 1 || 9 || 595
|-
!5
| Strong BJ  || 5 || 8 || 530
|-
!6
| Daisuke Sekimoto and Yoshihito Sasaki || 2 || 6 || 498
|-
!7
| Skinheaders || 1 || 1 || 460
|-
!8
| 045 Junkie's || 3 || 2 || 316
|-
!9
| Team Anko-gata || 1 || 4 || 310
|-
!10
| Akarangers || 1 || 1 || 289
|-
!11
| Ryota Hama and Yasufumi Nakanoue || 1 || 5 || 269
|-
!12
| Shadow WX and Tomoaki Honma || 1 || 3 || 238
|-
!13
| Mammoth Sasaki and Daisuke Sekimoto || 1 || 6 || 237
|-
!rowspan=2|14
| Daisuke Sekimoto and Kohei Sato || 1 || 3 || 236
|-
| Men's Teioh and Mr. Big Japan || 1 || 1 || 236
|-
!16
| Yoshihiro Tajiri and Ryuji Yamakawa || 2 || 3 || 213
|-
!17
| Abdullah Kobayashi and Ryuji Ito || 1 || 3 || 192
|-
!18
| Shadows  || 1 || 4 || 158
|-
!19
| Hamakami || 1 || 0 || 152
|-
!20
| Ryuji Yamakawa and Tomoaki Honma || 1 || 0 || 147
|-
!21
| Kamikaze and Abdullah Kobayashi || 1 || 2 || 135
|-
!22
| Daisuke Sekimoto and The Bodyguard || 1 || 1 || 134
|-
!23
| Kengo Mashimo and Madoka || 1 || 1 || 133
|-
!24
| Yuji Okabayashi and Shinobu || 1 || 2 || 132
|-
!25
| Okami || 3 || 4 || 130
|-
!26
| Kamikaze and Shunme Matsuzaki || 1 || 3 || 122
|-
!27
| Shoji Nakamaki and Ryuji Yamakawa || 1 || 2 || 112
|-
!rowspan=2|28
| Abdullah Kobayashi and Daisuke Sekimoto || 1 || 1 || 105
|-
| Skinheaders || 1 || 0 || 105
|-
!30
| Shadow WX and Ryuji Yamakawa || 1 || 3 || 75
|-
!31
| Shuji Ishikawa and Shigehiro Irie || 1 || 1 || 72
|-
!32
| Crazy Lovers || 1 || 1 || 70
|-
!33
| Masashi Takeda and Isami Kodaka || 1 || 0 || 60
|-
!34
| Ryuji Yamakawa and Mike Samples || 1 || 0 || 38
|-
!35
| Yoshihito Sasaki and Shinobu || 1 || 0 || 33
|-
!36
| Yoshihito Sasaki and Shinya Ishikawa || 1 || 0 || 31
|-
!37
| Kazumi Kikuta and Ryuichi Kawakami || 1 || 0 || 23
|-
!38
| Wifebeater and Justice Pain || 1 || 0 || 22
|-
!39
| The Brahman Brothers || 1 || 0 || 13
|-
!40
| Jado Jado and Gedo Gedo || 1 || 0 || 11
|-
!rowspan=2|41
| Kengo Kimura and Takashi Ishikawa || 1 || 0 || 8
|-
| Zandig and Nick Gage || 1 || 0 || 8
|-
!43
| Ryuji Ito and Badboy Hido || 1 || 0 || 4
|-

By wrestler

See also

Professional wrestling in Japan

References

External links 
 Official BJW Tag Team Championship Title History
 BJW Tag Team Championship at Cagematch.net

Big Japan Pro Wrestling championships
Tag team wrestling championships